Yehia Chahine (28 July 1917 – 18 March 1994) was an Egyptian film producer and an actor of film and theatre. He is most notable for his role in the film adaptations of the Cairo Trilogy, a trilogy written by the Nobel Prize-winning Egyptian author Naguib Mahfouz.

Life and career 
Yehia Chahine was born in Imbaba, Giza. His father's name was Yehia Chahine too. He received a diploma in performing arts and started acting in theatre. His first performance was in the play Murtafa`t wa Darag (Heights and Stairs). In 1935, he acted in his first film.

He acted in numerous films, but his most notable role is that of Al-Sayyid Ahmad Abd al-Jawad, a Cairene patriarch, in the Cairo Trilogy films. The three films, Bayn al-Qasrayn (Palace Walk, which is based on the Palace Walk novel) in 1964, Qasr al-Shawq (Palace of Desire) in 1967 and Al-Sukkariya (Sugar Street) in 1973, were set in Cairo and followed the family of Abd al-Jawwad across three generations, from World War I to the overthrow of King Farouk in 1952. They were well received and successful in Egypt and the Arab world.

Additionally, he has acted in many other successful films. He starred in film director Youssef Chahine's Ibn al-Nile (Son of the Nile) along with Faten Hamama in 1951. He played a leading role in the 1954 film Gaalouni Mujriman (I Have Been Made a Murderer), which was based on a novel by Naguib Mahfouz. In 1957, he starred in La Anam (Sleepless), a film that was chosen as one of the best 150 Egyptian film productions. His last film role was in 1988, in the film Kul Hatha al-Hub (All this Love).

Chahine received several awards for his film roles. In 1993, he received the Sciences and Arts prize. He died at the age of 76, on 18 March 1994.

Films
1947 – Azhar wa Ashwak (أزهار وأشواك)
1958 – "Haza Hoya el hob" ( هذا هو الحب)
1966 – "Thalath Losoos" (ثلاث لصوص)
1968 – "The Splendor of Love" (روعة الحب)
1969 – "Shey Min el Khouf" (شيء من الخوف)

References

External links 
 

1917 births
1994 deaths
Egyptian male stage actors
Egyptian male film actors
Egyptian film producers
20th-century Egyptian male actors